Pogosta disease is a viral disease. The symptoms of the disease usually include rash, as well as mild fever and other flu-like symptoms; in most cases the symptoms last less than 5 days. However, in some cases, the patients develop a painful arthritis. There are no known chemical agents available to treat the disease.

Cause
It has long been suspected that the disease is caused by a Sindbis-like virus, a positive-stranded RNA virus belonging to the Alphavirus genus and family Togaviridae. In 2002 a strain of Sindbis was isolated from patients during an  outbreak of the Pogosta disease in Finland, confirming the hypothesis.

Epidemiology
This disease is mainly found in the Eastern parts of Finland; the disease was first detected in 1974 in the old parish village of Ilomantsi, sometimes called Pogosta. A typical Pogosta disease patient is a middle-aged person who has been infected through a mosquito bite while picking berries in the autumn. The prevalence of the disease is about 100 diagnosed cases every year, with larger outbreaks occurring in 7-year intervals.

Etymology
It is also known as Karelian fever and Ockelbo disease. The names are derived from the words Pogosta, Karelia and Ockelbo.

References

External links 

Viral diseases
Insect-borne diseases